San Juan's at-large congressional district is the congressional district of the Philippines in San Juan. It has been represented in the House of Representatives of the Philippines since 1995. Previously included in San Juan–Mandaluyong's at-large congressional district, it includes all barangays of the city. It is currently represented in the 19th Congress by Ysabel Maria J. Zamora of the PDP–Laban.

Representation history

Election results

2022

2019

2016

2010

See also 

 Legislative district of San Juan, Metro Manila

References 

Congressional districts of the Philippines
Politics of San Juan, Metro Manila
1994 establishments in the Philippines
At-large congressional districts of the Philippines
Congressional districts of Metro Manila
Constituencies established in 1994